Monea is a small village and townland in County Fermanagh, Northern Ireland, about  northwest of Enniskillen. In the 2001 Census it had a population of 114.

Transport
Ulsterbus route 59 provides several journeys a day to/from Enniskillen and Derrygonnelly. There are no Saturday or Sunday services.

Places of interest 
Monea Castle, a historic monument, is located in Monea.

References 

Villages in County Fermanagh
Townlands of County Fermanagh